Bathymyrus is a genus of eels in the family Congridae.  It currently contains the following species:

 Bathymyrus echinorhynchus Alcock, 1889
 Bathymyrus simus J. L. B. Smith, 1965
 Bathymyrus smithi Castle, 1968 (Maputo conger)

References

 

Congridae